Percina macrocephala, also known commonly as the longhead darter, is a species of freshwater ray-finned fish, a darter in the subfamily Etheostomatinae, part of the family Percidae, which also contains the perches, ruffes, and pikeperches. P. macrocephala is endemic to the United States.

Geographic range
P. macrocephala occurs in the basin of the Ohio River from New York and North Carolina west as far as western central Kentucky and Tennessee.

Habitat
The preferred habitat of P. macrocephala is rocky pools with a strong flow, usually upstream or downstream from riffles with pebbles in clear, small to medium sized rivers. It also inhabits creeks.

Diet
P. macrocephala is carnivorous, and its food is mainly small crayfishes and mayfly nymphs.

References

https://web.archive.org/web/20130111034246/http://www.bio.utk.edu/hulseylab/Fishlist.html\

macrocephala
Fish described in 1867